Bill Widenhouse (born June 17, 1929 - died June 29, 1995) was a NASCAR Grand National driver from Midland, North Carolina, USA.

Career
Bill's average starting position was 22nd and his average finish position was 21st. This driver was a competitor at the 1955 Southern 500 and received a ninth-place finish as the result of the race.

Widenhouse's best finishes were on tri-oval intermediate tracks where he would finish in 18th place on average. His worst finishes would come on road courses with an average finish of 48th place.

References

1929 births
1995 deaths
NASCAR drivers
People from Cabarrus County, North Carolina
Racing drivers from Charlotte, North Carolina
Racing drivers from North Carolina